Yeshchenko or Eshchenko is a gender-neutral Slavic surname. Notable people with the surname include:

Aleksandr Yeshchenko (born 1970), Russian football player
Andrey Yeshchenko (born 1984), Russian football player
Oleg Yeshchenko (born 1995),  Russian football player